Omphalotropis guamensis  is a species of minute salt marsh snail with an operculum, a terrestrial gastropod mollusk, or micromollusk, in the family Assimineidae. This species is endemic to Guam.

References

Fauna of Guam
Omphalotropis
Assimineidae
Gastropods described in 1857
Taxonomy articles created by Polbot
Taxa named by Ludwig Karl Georg Pfeiffer